Plantago amplexicaulis is an annual plant of the family Plantaginaceae and the genus Plantago that grows in dry sand and deserts.

Plantago amplexicaulis is a therophyte, a type of plant that survives as seed during unfavourable conditions. In the deserts where P. amplexicaulis lives, this results in the desert suddenly bursting into bloom after a rainstorm.

References

External links

amplexicaulis
Taxa named by Antonio José Cavanilles